Fabio Battesini (19 February 1912 – 17 June 1987) was an Italian professional road bicycle racer. He won one stage in the 1931 Tour de France and three stages of the Giro d'Italia in 1932–1936.

Teams
 1930-1931: Maino-Clement
 1932: Gloria-Hutchison 
 1933: Maino-Ckement
 1934: Legnano
 1935: Wolsit
 1936-1938: Legano
 1938: La Volce Di Mantova
 1941: Dei
 1946: Viscontea

Major results

1931
Tour de France:
Winner stage 3
1932
Giro d'Italia:
Winner stage 3
1933
Milano–Mantova
1934
Giro d'Italia:
Winner stage 15
1935
Cremone
Giro della provincia Milano (with Learco Guerra)
1936
Giro d'Italia:
Winner stage 4

References

External links 

Official Tour de France results for Fabio Battesini

Italian male cyclists
1912 births
1987 deaths
Italian Tour de France stage winners
Cyclists from the Province of Mantua